Abutilon parvulum is a species of flowering plant in the mallow family known by the common names dwarf Indian mallow and dwarf abutilon and native to the southwestern United States and northern Mexico.

This is a perennial herb growing from a woody root and producing a multibranched stem to a maximum height near . The stem and foliage are covered thinly in woolly hairs. The solitary flowers have light orange to red rounded  petals just a few millimeters long. The fruit is a fuzzy body nearly a centimeter long divided into five segments.

References

External links
Jepson Manual Treatment

Photo gallery

parvulum